Troy Cablevision is a regional cable television, cable internet, Security Systems and Voice over Internet Protocol (VoIP) provider that serves Southeast Alabama. Its motto is "Your Hometown Communications Company". It is currently the only cable TV provider in the country that carries Pursuit Channel (based in Luverne) 24 hours a day. Currently, their services include Cable Television, Digital telephone, Broadband and Security Systems. Their employees are all based in Alabama, from network engineers to receptionists  all the way to the CEO.

Government Grants

Troy Cablevision, Inc. was awarded $26.1 million in federal stimulus funds in August 2010 to build a middle-mile fiber optic broadband network connecting Pike, Coffee, Crenshaw and Dale counties to Internet POP points in Montgomery and Dothan. The Southeast Alabama SmartBand initiative calls for 595 miles of fiber. The service provider already belongs to a publicprivate partnership with the South Alabama Electrical Cooperative for an effort to enable smart grid energy management services for the coop's 17,000 electric customers in Pike, Coffee and Crenshaw counties. That initiative will include two backhaul routes to Atlanta, which could boost connectivity and attract economic development to the area.

External links
 Troy Cablevision - Official Site

References

Cable television companies of the United States
Companies based in Alabama
Telecommunications companies of the United States
Internet service providers of the United States
Broadband
Video on demand
VoIP companies of the United States